The Natural Thing is a 1968 album by organist Brother Jack McDuff which was his first release on the Cadet label.

Reception
Al Campbell in his review for Allmusic states, "this isn't one of McDuff's strongest dates, but it does contain enjoyable moments".

Track listing 
All compositions by Jack McDuff except as indicated
 "Let My People Go" (Richard Evans, Jack McDuff) - 3:51  
 "Who Stole My Soul?" (Evans, Cleveland Eaton, Louis Satterfield) - 3:30  
 "L. David Sloan" (Angela Martin, Billy Meshel) - 3:37  
 "Funky Guru"  - 3:16  
 "Ain't It?" (Evans) - 3:00  
 "The Natural Thing" - 6:16  
 "Run on Home" - 5:33  
 "Con Alma" (Dizzy Gillespie) - 3:35  
 "Rock Candy"  - 4:49

Personnel 
Brother Jack McDuff - organ
Cliff Davis - flute, alto saxophone, tenor saxophone
Roland Faulkner, Phil Upchurch - guitar
Morris Jennings, James Slaughter, Marshall Thompson drums- drums
unidentified brass arranged and conducted by Richard Evans (tracks 1-3, 5 & 6)

References 

Jack McDuff albums
1968 albums
Cadet Records albums